Morgan's Mill is a historic grist mill located near Brevard, Transylvania County, North Carolina.  The original section was built about 1855.  It consists of the original mid-19th century heavy frame portion, a late-19th century balloon frame addition, and the final mid-20th century shed/porch section.

It was listed on the National Register of Historic Places in 1979.

References

Grinding mills in North Carolina
Grinding mills on the National Register of Historic Places in North Carolina
Industrial buildings completed in 1855
Buildings and structures in Transylvania County, North Carolina
National Register of Historic Places in Transylvania County, North Carolina